John Talen (born 18 January 1965) is a former road racing cyclist from the Netherlands, who was a professional from 1987 to 2000. As an amateur he won the world title in the 100 km team time trial, alongside Rob Harmeling, Tom Cordes and Gerrit de Vries, and finished second in the individual road race.

His biggest individual success as a pro was winning Dwars door Vlaanderen (1988) and the Scheldeprijs (1990). Talen rode in three editions of the Tour de France. In the 1994 Tour de France, he was last in the general classification, the lanterne rouge.

Major results

1984
1st Stage 5 Olympia's Tour
1985
1st  Overall Olympia's Tour
1986
2nd Overall Olympia's Tour
1st Stage 3
2nd Gran Premio della Liberazione
3rd Overall Circuit Cycliste Sarthe
1st Stage 3
1987
4th Omloop Het Volk
1988
1st Dwars door Vlaanderen
1st Grand Prix Pino Cerami
3rd Omloop Het Volk
6th Overall Ronde van Nederland
6th Overall KBC Driedaagse van De Panne-Koksijde
9th Overall Étoile de Bessèges
1989
1st Circuito de Getxo
1990
1st Scheldeprijs
1st Stage 1 Tirreno–Adriatico (ITT)
3rd Tour of Flanders
10th Paris–Roubaix
1991
1st Prologue Critérium du Dauphiné Libéré
1st Stage 3 Vuelta a Burgos
1st Stage 1a Vuelta a los Valles Mineros
2nd Overall Herald Sun Tour
1st Stage 2
3rd Veenendaal–Veenendaal
1993
1st Stage 2b Hofbrau Cup
1994
8th Memorial Samyn
1997
1st Nationale Sluitingprijs - Putte - Kapellen
1st Stage 1 Olympia's Tour
2nd Omloop van het Houtland Lichtervelde
2nd Hel van het Mergelland
1998
1st Stage 10 Olympia's Tour
7th Brussel-Ingooigem
1999
1st Stage 3 Olympia's Tour
2nd Omloop van het Houtland Lichtervelde
3rd Le Samyn
4th Omloop van het Waasland - Kemzeke
2000
2nd Kampioenschap van Vlaanderen
10th Nationale Sluitingprijs - Putte - Kapellen
2001
1st Stage 7 Ruban Granitier Breton
5th Omloop van het Houtland Lichtervelde
9th GP Rudy Dhaenens

Tour de France
1988 – 150th
1993 – 122nd
1994 – 117th (Lanterne rouge)

References

External links

1965 births
Living people
People from Meppel
Dutch male cyclists
UCI Road World Champions (elite men)
UCI Road World Championships cyclists for the Netherlands
Cyclists from Drenthe
20th-century Dutch people
21st-century Dutch people